The Colocalization Benchmark Source (CBS) is a free collection of downloadable images to test and validate the degree of colocalization of markers in any fluorescence microscopy studies. Colocalization is a visual phenomenon when two molecules of interest are associated with the same structures in the cells and potentially share common functional characteristics.

CBS provides researchers with reference tools to verify the results of quantitative colocalization measurements. It serves as a specialised bioimage informatics database of computer-simulated images with exactly known (pre-defined) values of colocalization. They were created using image simulation algorithm. These benchmark images can be downloaded as sets as well as separately. By calculating and comparing the values of coefficients on their images versus benchmark images, researchers can validate the results of quantitative colocalization studies. The use of CBS images was described in a number of studies.

Examples
Researchers can submit examples of custom images when the benchmark images were used to validate colocalization on them. Submitted images are then posted on the site of CBS together with description of their properties and the values of coefficients, such as Pearson's correlation coefficient (Rr), overlap coefficient (R), and others. The template for submitting information about custom images can be downloaded from CBS site.

See also
 Colocalization
 Fluorescence microscopy
 Bioimage informatics
 Biological database

References

External links
 Colocalization Benchmark Source home page

Biological databases
Microscopy
Fluorescence
Medical imaging